Bridgwater Town Council is a parish level authority in Bridgwater, Somerset, England. It owns and administers Bridgwater Town Hall, the Blake Museum and the adjacent historic Bridgwater Town Mill, and awards grants.

History
Following the  implementation of Local Government Act 1972 in March 1974, Bridgwater Borough Council was abolished, and Charter Trustees were created, drawn from the 16 councillors elected to Sedgemoor District Council in Somerset, England, that represented the borough wards, who maintained the continuity of the town's legal status until such time as a parish council was established. Duties were limited to ceremonial activities. In Bridgwater's case this extended to being responsible for the Town's charters, muniments and historic silver. 
 
Bridgwater Town Council was created in 2003, with sixteen elected members representing six wards of the town — Bower (three); Eastover (two); Hamp (three); Quantock (three); Sydenham (three) and Victoria (two). The wards were changed in 2011 to Westover (three); Hamp (two); Wyndham (two); Victoria (two); Eastover (two); Fairfax west (one); Fairfax east (two); Dunwear north (one) and Dunwear south (one).

The Council's seal has been used by the Mayor, Bailiffs and Burgesses of the town since the Middle ages.

Bridgwater Town Council owns Bridgwater Town Hall, which houses the Town Clerks office, Mayor’s Parlour, Charter Hall and meeting rooms and a new suite of additional offices plus numerous offices hired out to the community. The Town Hall main rooms have been restored, and some are available for hire.
 
 
It owns and administers the Blake Museum, and the adjacent historic Bridgwater Town Mill These are administered by joint committee of councillors and volunteer members of the Friends of Blake Museum, who do the day-to-day management. Trinity Hall is leased to On Your Bike, a local charity that trains people to refurbish bicycle and learn skills.

The Council gives financial support to the Victoria Park  and Sydenham Community centres and the Hamp Community Association. It gives financial support to Bridgwater Arts Centre, and in May 2020 it took over the ownership of the  Arts Centre from Sedgemoor District Council.
 
The town has international links with La Ciotat (France), 1957; Homberg (Efze) (Germany), 1992; Uherske Hradiste (Czech Republic), 1992; Marsa (Malta) 2006; Priverno (Italy) 2015; Seattle (USA) 2015 and Camacha, Madeira, (Portugal) 2019.

Town-wide Grants

The Council's two Grant Schemes are for one-off grants up to £2,500 for community groups. One is ring-fenced for grants in Wards; the other is for town-wide community groups with heritage, cultural and social aims, such as the Friends of Wembdon Road Cemetery, a group which is restoring a closed Victorian cemetery.

The Council funds with £7,000 the Quayside festival in the summer via the Bridgwater Cultural partnership.

In the winter it sponsors a Bridgwater History Day when various talks are given on aspects of the town's past.

Youth Grants - These total £10,000 per year and applications are decided by a 'Youth Forum' drawn from the schools.

Twinning Grants - These total c.£2,500 per year, of which £300 goes as general running to the 6 twinning organisations and the remainder on an annual twinning week.

Other Links
Blake Museum
John Chubb (artist)
Bridgwater Town Mill
Bridgwater Arts Centre

References

Parish councils of England
Local authorities in Somerset
Town Council